CBN-FM is a Canadian radio station broadcasting in St. John's, Newfoundland and Labrador at 106.9 MHz. The station was launched in 1975. It is part of the CBC's CBC Music network.

Local programming is limited to weather updates and a pre-broadcast of the local Radio One station's Saturday afternoon cultural program, The Performance Hour, on Saturdays at 11:30 a.m. The latter airs primarily to fill time, as some Saturday afternoon programs are timed to air live in both the Atlantic and Eastern time zones. Among CBC Music stations, only CBN-FM and Halifax's CBH-FM air any long-form local programming of this type.

Rebroadcasters

External links
 CBC Newfoundland and Labrador
 CBN-FM history – Canadian Communications Foundation
 

BN
BN